Cardarelli's sign is an abnormal pulsation of the trachea that may be found in patients with a dilation or aneurysm of the aortic arch.

Cardarelli's sign can be felt by a physician pressing on the thyroid cartilage and displacing it to the patient's left. This increases contact between the left bronchus and the aorta, allowing systolic pulsations from the aorta to be felt at the surface if an aneurysm is present.

See also
 Aortic aneurysm
 Oliver's sign
 Antonio Cardarelli

References 

Symptoms and signs: Vascular
Medical signs